David Hirshey is an American book editor and a contributing editor at Esquire. The senior vice president and executive editor of HarperCollins from 1998-2016, he was previously an editor for the New Yorker. Among others, he has worked with authors including Richard Ben Cramer, Frederick Exley, Richard Ford, Norman Mailer and David Halberstam. Hirshey wrote the weekly soccer column "Kicking and Screaming" for ESPN.com from 2010-2017. In 2018, he became Writer-at-Large for the soccer magazine Eight by Eight.

An expert on soccer, Hirshey co-wrote The ESPN World Cup Companion: Everything You Need To Know About The Planet's Biggest Sports Event and appeared in the 2006 documentary Once in a Lifetime: The Extraordinary Story of the New York Cosmos. He has written extensively on the sport for  The New York Times, Deadspin, The Wall Street Journal, the Los Angeles Times and The Washington Post.

Early life and education
Hirshey was born in New York City.  His father, Max Hirshey, was the president of Swarovski Crystal US and a former youth international soccer player, and his mother, Mara Hirshey, was a writer.  David Hirshey graduated with a  BA in English from Dickinson College, where he played varsity soccer for four years and wrote a weekly sports column for the student newspaper.

Career
Following his graduation, Hirshey was hired as a reporter at The New York Daily News, where, at 21, he was the youngest sportswriter in New York. In addition to major sporting events, Hirshey covered soccer, and in 1975 broke the story that Pelé was coming to New York to play for the  New York Cosmos. Five of his articles over the course of his tenure at The New York Daily News were anthologized in Houghton Mifflin's  annual Best Sports Stories of the Year.In 1978, Hirshey was named editor of the paper's Sunday News Magazine.  In that position, he worked with writers including Jimmy Breslin and Pete Hamill.

Hirshey was hired as a senior editor for Esquire in 1984 and promoted to articles editor in 1986. At Esquire  Hirshey worked closely with writers such as Frederick Exley, Richard Ford, David Halberstam, and Tom Robbins, among others. He edited Richard Ben Cramer's 1986 profile of Ted Williams, regarded  as "one of the greatest pieces of sportswriting ever." From 1991 through 1997, Hirshey was the deputy editor of Esquire.  In addition to editing long form pieces in the magazine, he oversaw the annual "Dubious Achievement" issue, which was described by The Washington Post as "hands down, the funniest year end issue of them all."

After leaving Esquire, Hirshey was hired as an editor at the New Yorker, where he assigned, developed and edited articles on future trends in politics, science, business, entertainment, culminating with "The Next Issue."

In 1998, he was named executive editor and vice president of HarperCollins Publishers. Promoted to senior vice president and executive editor in 2007, Hirshey specializes in politics, current affairs, sports, memoir, pop culture, and humor. Among other award-winning and bestselling books, Hirshey acquired and edited Jane Leavy's Sandy Koufax: A Lefty's Legacy, Sarah Silverman's The Bedwetter: Stories of Courage, Redemption and Pee, Dan Barry's Bottom of the 33rd: Hope, Redemption, and Baseball's Longest Game, which won the 2013 Pen Award for literary sportswriting, and Allen Kurzweil's Whipping Boy: The Forty-Year Search for My Twelve-Year-Old Bully, the 2016 Edgar Award winner for best crime non-fiction.

In May 2016, Hirshey announced that he would leave HarperCollins to relocate to Los Angeles. In late 2016 he was named a contributing editor at Esquire.

Bibliography

Selected bibliography as editor
Jane Leavy (2002), Sandy Koufax: A Lefty's Legacy, HarperCollins,  
Jane Leavy (2010), The Last Boy: Mickey Mantle and the End of America's Childhood, HarperCollins, 
Dan Barry (2012), Bottom of the 33rd: Hope, Redemption, and Baseball's Longest Game, HarperCollins, 
Dan Barry (2016), The Boys in the Bunkhouse: Servitude and Salvation in the Heartland,HarperCollins, 
Seymour M. Hersh (2004), Chain of Command: The Road from 9/11 to Abu Ghraib, HarperCollins, 
Michael Finkel (2005), True Story: Murder, Memoir, Mea Culpa, HarperCollins, 
Will Blythe (2006), To Hate Like This Is To Be Happy Forever, Harper Collins, 
Jeff MacGregor (2005), Sunday Money: Speed! Lust! Madness! Death! a Hot Lap Around America with NASCAR, HarperCollins, 
George Tenet (2007), At The Center of The Storm: My Years at the CIA, HarperCollins, 
Sarah Silverman (2012), The Bedwetter: Stories of Courage, Redemption and Pee, HarperCollins, 
Robert Kolker (2013), Lost Girls: An Unsolved American Mystery, HarperCollins, 
Scott Saul (2014), Becoming Richard Pryor, HarperCollins, 
Jeff Passan (2016), The Arm: Inside the Billion-Dollar Mystery of the Most Valuable Commodity in Sports, HarperCollins, 
Ariel Leve (2016), An Abbreviated Life: A Memoir, HarperCollins, 
Pete Townshend (2012), Who I Am: A Memoir, HarperCollins, 
Scott Raab (2011), The Whore of Akron: One Man's Search for the Soul of LeBron James, HarperCollins, 
Nate Jackson (2013), Slow Getting Up: A Story of NFL Survival from the Bottom of the Pile, HarperCollins, 
Allen Kurzweil (2015), Whipping Boy: The Forty-Year Search for My Twelve-Year- Old Bully, HarperCollins, 
Jason Zinoman (2017) Letterman: The Last Giant of Late Night  HarperCollins,

Bibliography as co-author
Bodo, Peter & David Hirshey with Pelé (1977), Pele's New World, Norton, 
Messing, Shep & David Hirshey (1978), The Education of An American Soccer Player, Dodd, Mead and Company, 
Hirshey, David and Roger Bennett (2010) The ESPN World Cup Companion: Everything You Need to Know About the Planet's Biggest Sports Event, ESPN,

Filmography
Once in a Lifetime: The Extraordinary Story of the New York Cosmos (2006)

References

External links
 Kicking and Screaming
 

Dickinson College alumni
Living people
Year of birth missing (living people)